Nana Stephen Owusu-Nsiah is a police officer and diplomat. He was the Ghanaian ambassador to Israel and a former Inspector General of Police of the Ghana Police Service (IGP).

Career
Owusu-Nsiah was appointed by President Kufuor as the IGP in 2001. He held this position for 4 years until his retirement in 2005.

Ambassador to Israel
Owusu-Nsiah was appointed the Ghanaian ambassador to Israel in May 2006 by President John Kufuor.

See also
Inspector General of Police of the Ghana Police Service

References

External links
Pictures of former IGPs
Head of Mission, Ghana Embassy, Israel

Year of birth missing (living people)
Living people
Ghanaian diplomats
Ghanaian police officers
Ambassadors of Ghana to Israel
Members of the Council of State (Ghana)
Ghanaian Inspector Generals of Police